Magnolysin (bovine neurosecretory granule protease cleaving pro-oxytocin/neurophysin, pro-oxytocin/neurophysin convertase, prooxyphysin proteinase, pro-oxytocin convertase) is an enzyme. This enzyme catalyses the following chemical reaction

 Hydrolysis of polypeptides with Arg or Lys in P1 and P2, e.g. to hydrolyse pro-oxytocin at -Lys-Arg-Ala-Val-.

This endopeptidase is present in bovine pituitary neurosecretory granules.

References

External links 
 

EC 3.4.24